Hemispheres is the sixth studio album by Canadian rock band Rush, released in October 1978 by Anthem Records. After touring to support the band's previous release, A Farewell to Kings, during which the group gained popularity in the UK, Rush started work on their next album. As with the band's previous studio album, Hemispheres was recorded at Rockfield Studios in Monmouthshire and Trident Studios in London with longtime engineer and arranger, Terry Brown. Rush continued its progressive rock sound with the side-long "Cygnus X-1 Book II: Hemispheres" and the nine-minute instrumental "La Villa Strangiato", which was the band's first instrumental piece.

Hemispheres received acclaim from music critics. It reached number 14 in Canada and the UK, and number 41 in the United States. The album's two shorter tracks, "Circumstances" and "The Trees" were released as singles in early 1979. In 1993, the album was certified platinum by the Recording Industry Association of America (RIAA) for selling one million copies. Rush supported Hemispheres with a concert tour from October 1978 to June 1979. The album was re-released in various expanded formats on November 16, 2018 as part of the band's ongoing 40th Anniversary editions, including the previously unreleased live set by the band at the Pinkpop Festival from June 1979.

Background and recording
In May 1978, Rush completed a nine-month tour of the United States, Canada, and the UK to support its fifth studio album, A Farewell to Kings (1977). The tour helped the band break through the UK market, following a series of well-received shows and "Closer to the Heart", the lead single from A Farewell to Kings, reaching number 36 on the UK Singles Chart.

Following a short break, the band regrouped to start work on its next album. In a departure from the band's previous album, they entered the songwriting process without any preconceived ideas, which proved to be a struggle; guitarist Alex Lifeson said: "the trouble started from basics." The band had enjoyed the experience of recording A Farewell to Kings in Wales at Rockfield Studios, situated on a farm in Rockfield, Monmouthshire, and agreed to record there for Hemispheres. They initially chose the studio having recorded four albums in Toronto and wanting a change; bassist and vocalist Geddy Lee said the United States did not appeal to them, and since they were influenced by many English bands, recording in the UK became a "natural" option. Before entering the studio, the band spent two weeks in intensive rehearsal, which sparked worries from the band regarding the direction the album was to take. The conditions of the studio, located on a farm, lacked the standard facilities, including a sofa; Lee described it as "really funky". In one incident, a latch that failed to shut the studio doors frustrated Lifeson who, in a fit, took it off, installed a hydraulic door opener, and built a handle on it.

Rush recorded Hemispheres in June and July 1978 at Rockfield Studios with longtime producer Terry Brown, also credited as co-arranger, and engineer Pat Moran. It marked the longest studio time booked for the band. In comparison, 2112 (1976) was recorded in five weeks and A Farewell to Kings was completed in four. After the music was put down, the group settled in Advision Studios in London to record the vocals. The album was then mixed in August at Trident Studios in London by Brown and assistant John Brand. In the three-month period of putting the album together, Rush took just one day off. Costs of the album were calculated to be around $100,000, making it the band's most expensive album at the time. Drummer Neil Peart recalled the band were exhausted by the time of completion and took a six-week vacation to recover, while Lee explained that they "greatly underestimated the level of overachievement that  were shooting for".

Songs

Side one
"Cygnus X-1 Book II: Hemispheres" occupies the album's first side. An 18-minute track and sequel to "Cygnus X-1 Book I: The Voyage" on A Farewell to Kings, the song has six distinct parts. Initially, Lee had a different idea for the album's centerpiece track, but after some music had been written the group felt it right to continue the story. Book I concerns the journey of the Rocinante, a spaceship that enters a black hole in outer space. Peart ended the story without a set conclusion, and only began to write Book II three weeks before the band was set to travel to Rockfield Studios. The process was stressful for Peart, took "hours of tearing my hair out", and was only half complete when they arrived. The sequel, like Book I, uses mythology and symbolism to depict a conflict between the gods Apollo and Dionysus, which is resolved when Cygnus intervenes, claiming a balance of heart and mind are what is needed for humans to live well. Peart introduced the gong and timpani to his percussion set for the first time; he hadn't thought of adding the instrument on previous albums but thought Hemispheres needed it.

Side two
"Circumstances" is the first of two shorter tracks on Hemispheres. With the band having accustomed its audience to longer, more elaborate formats, this song is qualified by Lee as an experiment, an attempt to break away from the prog formula that would steer the band into new directions in later albums.

"The Trees" tells the story of a forest of oak and maple trees, the latter causing an upheaval because the oak trees grow too large and take all the sunlight. The maple trees form a union in an effort to have the oaks cut down to a smaller size. Lee explains that the fact that the band was recording in the Welsh countryside set the overall tone for the song: "You're watching English television, walking in the Welsh countryside; there are sheep talking to you in the early morning when you're trying to sleep ... lyrics came first, and we wanted to construct a dynamic little tale as a soundtrack to those lyrics".

"La Villa Strangiato" is a nine-minute instrumental in 12 distinct sections and a subtitle of "An Exercise in Self-Indulgence". According to Lifeson, it is based on the various nightmares he would have, particularly while on tour, which provided the theme to what he described as a "musical re-creation" of them. The track was the sole piece that developed from the two-week rehearsal period the group had prior to entering the studio. Rush encountered great difficulty in recording it, as the band wanted it put down as a single live performance, rather than a more produced and edited piece. Lee said it took them around 40 takes to produce a take they were satisfied with. Peart and Lee pointed out that they spent more time recording "La Villa Strangiato" than they did recording the entire Fly by Night (1975) album. Peart recalled the group spent four days and nights playing it repeatedly, playing while their hands were sore and their minds tired. "We were determined to get the whole thing perfect, but in the end I just couldn't do it, and we ended up putting it together from a few different takes." The segments "Monsters!" and "Monsters! (Reprise)" are adapted from "Powerhouse", a 1937 jazz instrumental by Raymond Scott.

Artwork
The cover was designed by longtime Rush collaborator, graphic artist Hugh Syme. The front depicts a figure that resembles the one in the painting The Son of Man by surreal artist René Magritte who is standing on the left side of a human brain. He is looking in the direction of a nude man in a ballet pose who is standing on the right side. The overall image was Syme's own creation, but it developed from discussions with Peart about the idea of left and right and the Apollonian and Dionysian parts of the brain. The Magritte figure is Syme's longtime friend Bobby King, who was also the nude model for Rush's Starman logo on 2112 that Syme had also designed. The naked male is a dancer from the Toronto Ballet School. The brain was loaned to Syme from the Department of Anatomy at the University of Toronto Faculty of Medicine for him to photograph and the final design was completed with a composite. The background was a combination of airbrush and paint. Syme started working on the design before he had heard any music on the album.

Release
Prior to the album's release, Hemispheres aired in its entirety on Night at 11, hosted by Rick Ringer on CHUM-FM in Toronto, on October 5, 1978. It was released October 28, 1978, and reached number 14 on the Canadian Albums Chart and UK Albums Chart, and number 47 on the US Billboard 200. For a short time, Hemispheres was released in Canada on red vinyl with a gatefold sleeve with a poster (catalogue number SANR-1-1015) and as a limited edition picture disc (SRP-1300). The album was awarded a silver certification in the UK. In the US, Hemispheres proved to be a steady seller in the band's catalogue; it was certified platinum by the Recording Industry Association of America (RIAA) in December 1993 for selling one million copies, 15 years after its release.

Reception

Reviewing the album for the magazine, Michael Bloom stated, "Overall, especially in 'La Villa Strangiato', Lifeson, Peart and Lee prove themselves masters of every power-trio convention. In fact, these guys have the chops and drive to break out of the largely artificial bounds of the format, and they constantly threaten to do so but never quite manage."

In the review for AllMusic, Greg Prato favourably compared the album to the band's previous work, "While the story line isn't as comprehensible as 2112 was, it's much more consistent musically, twisting and turning through five different sections which contrast heavy rock sections against more sedate pieces."

PopMatters ranked Hemispheres the 12th best progressive rock album of all time.

Reissues

Track listing

40th Anniversary Edition (2018)

Track 10 recorded live May 28, 1979 at Stadthalle Offenbach, West Germany; incorrectly credited as Live in Arizona: November 20, 1978

Personnel
Credits are adapted from the album's sleeve notes.

Rush
 Geddy Lee – bass guitar, Minimoog synthesizer, Oberheim polyphonic synthesizer, Moog Taurus bass pedals, vocals
 Alex Lifeson – 6- and 12-string electric and acoustic guitars, classical guitar, Roland guitar synthesizer, Moog Taurus pedals
 Neil Peart – drums, orchestra bells, bell tree, tympani, gong, cowbells, temple blocks, wind chimes, crotales

Production
 Rush – production, arrangement
 Terry Brown – production, arrangement, mixing at Trident Studios
 Pat Moran – engineering at Rockfield Studios
 Declan O'Doherty – engineering at Advision Studios
 John Brand – mixing assistance at Trident Studios
 Ray Staff – mastering
 Simon Hilliard – tape operator at Trident Studios
 Mike Donegani – tape operator at Trident Studios
 Reno Ruocco – tape operator at Trident Studios
 Ray Staff – mastering at Trident Studios
 Hugh Syme – graphics, art direction
 Bob King – art direction
 Yosh Inouye – cover photography
 Fin Costello – inner sleeve and poster photography
 Moon Records – executive production

Charts

Certifications

References

Citations

Books

External links
 

1978 albums
Albums produced by Terry Brown (record producer)
Albums recorded at Rockfield Studios
Albums recorded at Trident Studios
Anthem Records albums
Mercury Records albums
Rock operas
Rush (band) albums